Daniel French Slaughter Jr. (May 20, 1925 – October 2, 1998) was an American politician and member of the United States House of Representatives from January 3, 1985, until his resignation on November 5, 1991.

Early life and education
Daniel Slaughter Jr. was born in Culpeper, Virginia, and attended public schools in Culpeper County. He attended Virginia Military Institute and graduated in 1953 with a B.A. and LL.B. from the University of Virginia, where he was a member of the Raven Society and of St. Anthony Hall.

Early career
Slaughter served in the United States Army in combat infantry from 1943 to 1947 and was awarded the Purple Heart. He was admitted to the bar and practiced law in Culpeper.

He served in the Virginia House of Delegates from 1958 to 1978, serving as a Democrat until 1974, when he became an independent.  In the early 1960s, he supported "massive resistance" to court-ordered school integration. He was a member of the board of visitors of the University of Virginia from 1978 to 1982, where he also served as rector from 1980 to 1982. From 1981 to 1984 he served as aide to John Otho Marsh Jr., the Secretary of the Army.

Congressional career
Slaughter was elected from the 7th congressional district of Virginia in 1984 as a Republican.  He was reelected three more times.  However, he resigned on November 5, 1991, due to a series of strokes.  He died in Charlottesville, Virginia, on October 2, 1998.

Electoral history
1984; Slaughter was elected to the U.S. House of Representatives with 56.5% of the vote, defeating Democrat Lewis M. Costello and Independent R.E. Frazier.
1986; Slaughter was re-elected unopposed.
1988; Slaughter was re-elected unopposed.
1990; Slaughter was re-elected with 58.19% of the vote, defeating Democrat David M. Smith.

External links

Virginia House of Delegates bio for D. Slaughter
Washington Post's obituary for Slaughter

|-

|-

|-

|-

1925 births
1998 deaths
People from Culpeper, Virginia
University of Virginia School of Law alumni
Members of the Virginia House of Delegates
Military personnel from Virginia
United States Army personnel of World War II
Virginia lawyers
Virginia Democrats
Republican Party members of the United States House of Representatives from Virginia
20th-century American lawyers
20th-century American politicians